Lo Flux Tube is the second album by the band OLD. It marked a change in style for the band, abandoning their previous grindcore parody in favor of a much more industrial and experimental sound.

Track listing

Personnel
O.L.D.
Alan Dubin - Vocals
James Plotkin - Guitars, Programming
Jason Everman - Bass

Guest musician
John Zorn - Saxophone on "Lo Flux Tube"

Production
Simon Curtis - Cover art
Steve Sisco - Producer
James Plotkin - Producer

References

External links
 Encyclopaedia Metallum page

1991 albums
OLD (band) albums
Concept albums
Earache Records albums
Albums produced by James Plotkin